The 1962 Ole Miss Rebels football team was an American football team that represented the University of Mississippi in the Southeastern Conference (SEC) during the 1962 NCAA University Division football season. In their 16th year under head coach Johnny Vaught, the Rebels compiled a perfect 10–0 record, outscored opponents by a total of 247 to 53, won the SEC championship, and defeated Arkansas in the 1963 Sugar Bowl. To date, it is the only undefeated and untied season in Ole Miss football history.

Mississippi finished No. 1 in the season's final Litkenhous Ratings. They ranked No. 3 in the final AP and UPI coaches polls released in December 1962. USC was selected as the national champion by both the AP and UPI. In later retrospective analyses, Ole Miss was recognized as the 1962 national champion by the Billingsley Report and Sagarin Ratings. In September 2012, Ole Miss athletic director Ross Bjork announced that the 1962 team would be receiving national championship rings to honor their accomplishments.

Ole Miss tackle Jim Dunaway was a consensus first-team player on the 1962 All-America college football team. Quarterback Glynn Griffing was also selected as a first-team All-American by the Football Writers Association of America. The team's statistical leaders included Griffing with 882 passing yards and 278 rushing yards and Lou Guy with 295 receiving yards and 42 points scored.

The Rebels' undefeated season was set against the backdrop of the civil rights movement taking place on their own campus as James Meredith, aided by the United States government, was attempting to be the first African American student to enroll at the university. In 2012, ESPN aired a documentary on the team, Ghosts of Ole Miss, as part of its 30 for 30 series.

Schedule

Roster

 Allen Brown, end
 Willis Dabbs, end
 Don Dickson, line
 Kenny Dill, line
 Jim Dunaway, tackle
 Perry Lee Dunn, Jr., fullback
 Glynn Griffing, quarterback
 Lou Guy, back
 Whaley Hall, line
 Conrad Hitchler, end
 Fred Kimbrell, line
 Chuck Morris, back
 Buck Randall, back
 Frank Roberts, back
 James Roberts, line
 Richard Ross, line
 Jim Weatherly, quarterback

Awards
SEC Coach of the Year: Johnny Vaught
 1962 All-America college football team
 Tackle Jim Dunaway, consensus first-team All-American
 Quarterback Glynn Griffing, first-team All-America pick by Football Writers Association of America (FWAA)
 1962 All-SEC football team
 Quarterback Glynn Griffing (AP-1, UPI-1)
 Halfback Louis Guy (UPI-3)
 Tackle Jim Dunaway (UPI-1)
 Guard Don Dickson (AP-1, UPI-1)

References

Ole Miss
Ole Miss Rebels football seasons
College football national champions
Southeastern Conference football champion seasons
Sugar Bowl champion seasons
College football undefeated seasons
Ole Miss Rebels football